Phrynopus juninensis is a species of frog in the family Strabomantidae. It is endemic to Peru and only known from Cascas near Huasihuasi, Department of Junín. Records from Department of Pasco probably belong to another species. Common name Junin Andes frog has been proposed for this species.

Description
A relatively large species of its genus, Phrynopus juninensis males measure  and females  in snout–vent length. The snout is rounded in lateral view. No tympanum is present. The toes have no webbing. Dorsal coloration is dark brown with tan spots above and silvery-white flecks below. The lips are pale grayish tan with dark brown bars. The iris is bronze. There are dark brown canthal and supratympanic stripes.

Habitat and conservation
It is a terrestrial species. Development is direct (i.e, there is no free-living larval stage).

Known only from a single location, P. juninensis is an uncommon and rarely seen species. It is threatened by habitat loss caused by agricultural activities. It is also potentially threatened by harvesting of Sphagnum mosses. It is not known to occur in any protected areas.

References

juninensis
Amphibians of the Andes
Amphibians of Peru
Endemic fauna of Peru
Taxa named by Benjamin Shreve
Amphibians described in 1938
Taxonomy articles created by Polbot